Kandula Ashanna  (11 May 1923 – 23 September 2007) was an Indian politician and a Member of Parliament of India. He was a member of the 2nd Lok Sabha and represented the Adilabad constituency of Andhra Pradesh. Ashanna was a member of the Congress political party.

Political career
Ashanna was the second elected M.P from Adilabad constituency. This was his only term in the Lok Sabha of India.

Posts Held

See also

Andhra Pradesh Legislative Assembly
Lok Sabha
Parliament of India
Politics of India

References

1923 births
2007 deaths
India MPs 1957–1962
Indian National Congress politicians from Andhra Pradesh
Lok Sabha members from Andhra Pradesh
People from Adilabad district
People from Adilabad
Telugu politicians